Július Brocka (born 1 January 1957 in Modra) is a Slovak retired politician. In 1994 he briefly served as Labor minister in the technocratic government of Jozef Moravčík. From 1992 to 2016 he served as a Member of the National Council in the caucus of the Christian Democratic Movement.

Brocka studied Civil Engineering at the Slovak University of Technology in Bratislava, graduating in 1981. Before entering politics, he worked as a engineer.

Brocka has four children.

References 

Labour ministers of Slovakia
Slovak Democratic Coalition politicians
Christian Democratic Movement politicians
People from Modra
Living people
1957 births
Members of the National Council (Slovakia) 1992-1994
Members of the National Council (Slovakia) 1994-1998
Members of the National Council (Slovakia) 1998-2002
Members of the National Council (Slovakia) 2002-2006
Members of the National Council (Slovakia) 2006-2010
Members of the National Council (Slovakia) 2010-2012
Members of the National Council (Slovakia) 2012-2016
Slovak University of Technology in Bratislava alumni